The Internet in Vietnam (ccTLD: .vn) is growing rapidly. Between 2001 and 2005, the number of Internet users increased from 800,000 to 3 million. By 2007, Vietnam reported Internet penetration levels of 11.5 percent, rising to 22.4 percent in 2008 and 45.2% in 2010. By 2013, Vietnam officials reported Internet penetration levels of 75.2 percent, which is about 68 million users with Wifi signals that can be found anywhere in every commercial and residential area. As of January 2021, out of its population of over 96 million people, the number of internet users reached approximately 69 million. Internet usage in Vietnam is predominantly mobile-based, thanks to the high smartphone penetration rate. Using the internet has become a daily habit among many Vietnamese people, with multiple purposes including work, study, entertainment, and more.

History
A professor at the Australian National University, Rob Hurle, is considered to be the first person to connect Vietnam to the Internet. Hurle first presented his ideas about bringing Internet access to Vietnamese students studying in Australia. In 1991, Hurle took a modem to Vietnam to connect the country to the global Internet.

About 60% of Vietnam's internet traffic is through the Asia-America Gateway cable. A larger Asia Pacific Gateway cable was deployed in 2016.

Vietnam also has an emerging e-commerce sector with fast-growing market value. During the COVID-19 pandemic, Vietnamese consumers have shopped online more than ever, reinforcing the strong growth of the e-commerce sector. Before the pandemic, travel, mobility, and accommodation were the e-commerce category with the highest consumer spending. Since the first outbreak of COVID-19 in Vietnam, consumers have been more willing to shop for basic necessities and fresh products online, making food and personal care the e-commerce category with the highest growth in 2020. These new shopping habits are expected to remain even after the pandemic.

Development

Legal and regulatory frameworks

References